Euphane is a tetracyclic triterpene that is the 13α,14β-stereoisomer of lanostane. Its derivatives are widely distributed in many plants.

See also
 Protostane
 Dammarane
 Lanostane

References

Triterpenes